Adam's Apple (1924 – 1946) was a British Thoroughbred racehorse best known for winning a British Classic, the 2000 Guineas Stakes.

Background
Adam's Apple was sired by Pommern, the 1915 English Triple Crown champion. His dam Mount Whistle was a daughter of the Ascot Gold Cup winner William the Third.

Racing career
At age two, Adam's Apple won the Soltykoff Stakes at Newmarket Racecourse. He ran third in the 1926 Criterion Stakes at Newmarket Racecourse and third again in the New Stakes at Ascot Racecourse  behind Sickle and the winner, Damon. He made four starts as a three-year-old, finishing off the board in three; however, he was ridden to victory by jockey Jack Leach in the 1927 2000 Guineas Stakes, defeating runner-up Call Boy (later The Derby winner), with Sickle third.

Stud record
After his retirement from racing, Adam's Apple was sold to Argentine breeders.  There he met with some success, siring the filly Chimentera, winner of the Las Oaks at Santiago Chile's Club Hipico de Santiago, and the very good filly La Bastille, likewise a winner of the Oaks but who also defeated her male counterparts in winning the El Derby at the Valparaiso Sporting Club racetrack at Vina del Mar, Chile. Adam's Apple died in 1946 at the Ojo de Agua stud in Argentina.

Notes

1924 racehorse births
1946 racehorse deaths
Racehorses bred in the United Kingdom
Racehorses trained in the United Kingdom
Thoroughbred family 27-a
2000 Guineas winners